Dick Clark + Associates, formerly known as Dick Clark Architecture, LLC is an Austin, Texas-based architectural firm.

The firm, founded in 1979 by Dick Clark III (1944-2017), designs contemporary architecture. Dick Clark Architecture's projects include residential, commercial, educational, and restaurant design and the firm is credited with helping design Austin's visual landscape. They are also involved in the revitalization of Austin's downtown Warehouse District.  The firm has earned a number of industry awards.

Dick Clark
Dick Clark III, FAIA (1944 - August 7, 2017) was the principal of the firm Dick Clark Architecture located in Austin, Texas. Clark was educated at the University of Texas at Austin School of Architecture and Harvard Graduate School of Design. He practiced architecture in Boston, Knoxville, Managua, Aspen, Copenhagen and throughout Texas. During his 45 years as an architect, Dick designed more than 1,000 projects, including 500 custom or spec homes; fostered more than 20 architectural firms; and won more than 70 awards, including the prestigious peer-sponsor and peer-selected title of Fellow from the AIA in 2013. Other projects included commercial buildings, resorts, hotels, retail, multifamily housing, golf facilities. Dick Clark has many award-winning restaurants and entertainment venues in Houston, San Antonio, Dallas and Austin's downtown Warehouse District. With over 30 years of experience in Austin, Dick Clark is well known in the community and had a reputation of creating spaces that are warm, inviting and integral to the city fabric.

Dick Clark has contemporary design sensibilities with particular attention to combining humble and rich materials to bring interest and value to a project. His respect for renewable resources combined with his design talent garnered him the first Green Building Design Award from the City of Austin. Dick Clark was honored with the city's first Downtown Austin Alliance Downtown Impact Award for contributing to the standard of excellence in design.

Influences
From 1969 to 1971 Mr. Clark worked for Bud Oglesby in Dallas, Texas. He was inspired by Mr. Oglesby's contemporary style and unique design abilities.

Dick Clark taught at the University of Tennessee from 1974 to 1976.  During this time Mr. Clark lead a team a students in Masaya, Nicaragua. They arrived just after the 1972 Nicaragua earthquake that decimated most of Managua. There they worked with the local government and citizens to plan and rebuild some of what was lost. Their efforts were supported by Mick Jagger who, with the Rolling Stones donated $300,000 to build 3000 homes south of Managua. Most of the money was raised during the Rolling Stones Pacific Tour 1973.

Most recently Mr. Clark served on the Advisory Board for the University of Texas at Austin, School of Architecture where he participated regularly in Design Review Jury's.

Gallery

Awards 

 2008, 2007, 2002, 2001, 2000, 1998, 1997, 1996 AIA Honor Award 
 2004 Custom Home Design Award
 2003 International Interior Design Association Award 
 1999 Downtown Austin Alliance Inaugural Downtown Impact Award

References

External links 
http://www.dcarch.com/

Architecture firms based in Texas
Modernist architects
Companies based in Austin, Texas
Design companies established in 1979
Modernist architecture in the United States